The Battle of Gangut (Finland Swedish: Slaget vid Rilax) took place on 27 JulyJul./ 7 August 1714Greg. during the Great Northern War (1700–1721), in the waters of Riilahti Bay, north of the Hanko Peninsula, near the site of the modern-day city of Hanko, Finland, between the Swedish Navy and Imperial Russian Navy. It was the first important victory of the Russian fleet in its history.

Name of the battle
The word Gangut in the name of the battle is a romanization of Гангут, which is the traditional Russian cyrillization of Hangöudd, the traditional Swedish name of the Hanko Peninsula. Seldom used names are Battle of Hangö (Finnish Hanko) and Battle of Hangöudd (Finnish Hankoniemi). The battle took place in the Rilax bay north of the Hanko Peninsula. In Sweden and Finland, the battle is therefore known as the Battle of Rilax (Finnish Riilahti).  It is also known in some sources as the battle of Ahvenanmaa, the Finnish name of Åland which Russia seized after its victory.

Background
The Russian Tsar Peter I had begun his offensive in Finland in the spring of 1713. The Russian armies quickly advanced all the way to Turku on the southwestern coast of Finland, and with Russian victory in the Battle of Storkyro on 19 February 1714, left southern Finland fully in Russian control. The Russian governor in Finland, Prince Mikhail Galitzine, with his headquarters in Turku, was unable to receive support by sea, which was then far more important than land-based support as Swedish battle fleet under Admiral Gustav Wattrang had started blockading the coastal sea route past Hanko Peninsula already on 24 April. While it also blockaded the Russian supply route the blockade also prevented the Russian coastal fleet from reaching Sweden and raiding the Swedish coast. First Russian transports left from Helsingfors in early May but had to stop east of Hangö to Ekenäs from where the supplies needed to be hauled overland. Russian attempts to provide ships to west of Hangö ended when newly formed Swedish coastal squadron led by Captain Anton Wrangel intercepted the Russian supply ships south of Turku on 10 May and in one sided engagement sunk most of them while the rest were scattered. Admiral Apraksin's fleet was sent from its base at Kronstadt by the Tsar to open these service lines.

Arrival at Hanko
When the 80 ship strong Russian galley fleet arrived near the peninsula on 29 June 1714 they were met by a strong Swedish naval fleet consisting of 16 ships of the line and 7 smaller ships under the command of Admiral Wattrang. Apraksin decided to withdraw his ships farther away to the eastern side of the peninsula and call for reinforcements while he waited for the further 20 galleys to arrive from Helsingfors where they had been over the winter. The majority of the troops in Turku were moved according to his request to the peninsula.

A plea for help was also sent to the Tsar, who was with the rest of the Baltic Fleet in Reval (now Tallinn). Admiral Apraksin specifically let the Tsar know that he should come personally to lead the attack. Russian battle fleet of 10 ships of the line and 6 frigates was originally intended to participate to the breakthrough attempt at Hangö but upon inspecting the fleet Tsar found it ill-prepared for battle and abandoned the use of the battlefleet. Further he ordered that fleet should not engage unless it would have clear superiority in artillery (3 : 2). Peter I reached the Russian coastal fleet on 20 July.

The breakthrough
The first attempt in breaking through the Swedish lines was made by attempting to pull the galleys over the peninsula. The friction was reduced using ox skins between the ground and the ships. The first galley was successfully pulled over with much trouble, but the second was damaged, and the attempt was subsequently abandoned. However, Admiral Wattrang had been informed of the Russians' attempt, and he sent a small naval detachment consisting of 11 ships led by Schoutbynacht (equivalent of a Rear Admiral) Nils Ehrenskiöld to intercept the Russians. Swedish efforts forced Russians to abandon their plans few days later.

Ehrenskiöld's detachment consisted of following ships:

The second attempt by the Russians took advantage of the calm weather on the morning of 26 July, the day of Saint Pantaleon. The small galleys were easily maneuvered, whereas it was exceedingly difficult to try to turn the heavy Swedish battleships in such a weather. Apraksin initially sent 20 small galleys which succeeded in running the blockade and then as Swedes started towing their sailing ships further out to sea with rowing boats he sent 15 further galleys to the same route though the second group had to go much further around since Swedes had moved away from the immediate vicinity of the coast.

With Wattrang's fleet moved outwards in an attempt to block the Russian breakthrough, the Russians started their blockade run on early hours of 27 July along the now clear sea route just alongside the cape. Despite of frantic Swedish efforts to stop the Russians only few of the Swedish ships reached firing range and even then their artillery fire had very little effect. Only one galley was lost when it ran aground. Now only Ehrenskjöld's small coastal squadron stood between Russian coastal fleet and the maze like archipelago of Åland and southwestern Finland.

The battle

After the breakthrough Russian galleys were gradually pushing Ehrenskjöld's detachment back who in turn ordered his vessels to form a defensive line between two islands. One of the skerry-boats was scuttled in order to narrow down the area where the fight would take place with obstacles. The largest Swedish ship, the pram Elefanten, was positioned broadside-on to the approaching Russian vessels. Three galleys were stationed end-on on each side, with the boats behind the line. After Ehrenskiöld refused to surrender, the Russian fleet attacked on 27 July 1714 at 14:00. According to Swedish sources, the Russian galleys, commanded by the Tsar, attacked twice (first with 35, second with 80 galleys) but were thrown back. The third time, when attacking with reinforcements and a combined force of about 95 galleys, the Russians managed to reach the Swedish ships and engage in close quarters combat where superior Russian numbers could be used to their advantage. Russians managed to board the Swedish galley far left in the line, the Tranan, which capsized and sank creating a hole into the Swedish line. Russian galleys made use of the opening and were quickly able to start boarding the rest of the Swedish ships. Fighting lasted for three hours as Swedes defended all of their ships with fighting ending to the capture of Elefanten where Admiral Ehrenskiöld himself was taken prisoner of war on the deck of his own flagship.

The Swedish description of the battle, however, is not supported by Russian documents of the time and was proven incorrect in many aspects by the Russian historian Prof. Paul A. Krotov in 1996. In his research based on a large number of Russian and foreign archive documents related to the battle and dating back to the 18th century, Krotov demonstrates that the Russian fleet launched only one single yet massive attack on the Swedish position. He states that the number of Russian casualties as reported by the Swedish officer C. G. Tornquist is hugely inflated and increased from 127 men killed and 347 wounded, a figure supported by documentary evidence, to 3,000 dead and 1,600 wounded, which is more than the number of Russian sailors engaged in the fighting. Furthermore, despite the Swedish claim that only 60 Russian galleys made their way to Åbo due to severe damage, it is known from wartime sources that all the galleys sailed there on 1 August 1714 in full force. The overall number of Russian galleys was slightly smaller than reported: 98. Krotov also discovered numerous sources mentioning that over the course of the battle 4 Russian “scampavia” gunboats attacked the Swedish ships from the rear.

Russian galleys were different designs from Swedish galleys and while carrying generally inferior artillery, two 6-pounder guns per galley, they had larger crew complement, usually close to 200 men per galley. The Russians substantially outnumbered the Swedish, according to some Swedish sources 15 to one. The Russian superiority in the battle was such that there wasn't even enough room for all the Russian vessels to fight at once, so only 23 vessels engaged.

Consequences

While the defeat of the small Swedish squadron didn't have much consequences, the fact that over 70 Russian galleys had run the Swedish blockade at Hangö and reached the Archipelago Sea had. The Swedish battlefleet which had been blockading Hanko Peninsula was quickly moved west of Åland to protect Sweden against raids by Russian galleys. This also opened the coastal seaway for the Russian transports. A Russian galley fleet under Admiral Apraksin started from Rilax on 1 August to sail towards Åbo from where he continued already on 5 August towards Åland. By 8 August Apraksin reached the east coast of Åland triggering Swedish withdrawal from the islands. On 13 August whole of Åland was under Russian control. As the Swedish battlefleet prevented Apraksin from reaching Sweden the galleys were diverted to support the Russian army fighting along the coast of Gulf of Bothnia with small squadron plundering and razing the Swedish town of Umeå on 18 September. The Presence of the Russian galley fleet on Bay of Bothnia forced the remnants of the Swedish army in Finland to hastily withdraw to Torne River to avoid getting encircled.

Legacy

Russians later embellished the description of the battle of Gangut by reclassifying the oared flat-bottomed gun pram Elefanten into a full sailing frigate.

The battle was the first major victory of the Russian galley fleet, and is occasionally as such compared by Russians with the Battle of Poltava.

The victory is even nowadays celebrated by the Russian Navy; Russia's Navy Day holiday takes place on the last Sunday of July in commemoration of the battle. The Imperial Navy traditionally had one vessel named Gangut, with its first series of Dreadnought battleships named the Gangut class.

The first monument to commemorate the Russian Navy, a wooden cross, was erected on the site in 1869 by Rear Admiral Rimsky-Korsakov, brother of the famous composer, Nikolai Rimsky-Korsakov. The wooden cross was replaced by a more permanent stone cross in 1870 by the order of Tsar Alexander II. The memorial is at Riilahti manor in Bromarv, Raseborg, Finland, which is owned by the Aminoff family.

Related battles
 Battle of Grengam (1720) — was fought on the same day six years later and marked the end of Swedish supremacy in the Baltic waters;
 Battle of Svensksund (1790) — Sweden's most ambitious attempt to regain supremacy in the Baltic.

References

Bibliography

External links

Vyborg and Gangut in History of Russian Navy 
History of the Russian Navy
Article 'Slaget vid Rilax' in magazine 'Fanbäraren'
Nordisk familjebok, Volume 7 (1907), Column 17, Nils Ehrenschiöld

Gangut
Gangut
1714 in Europe
Hanko